Chitty Chitty Bang Bang is a 1968 British musical adventure fantasy film starring Dick Van Dyke and Sally Ann Howes.

Chitty Chitty Bang Bang may also refer to:

Arts and entertainment
 Chitty-Chitty-Bang-Bang, the original 1964 novel by Ian Fleming
 Chitty Chitty Bang Bang (car), the vintage racing car which features in the book, musical film and stage production of the same name
 Chitty Chitty Bang Bang (musical), a 2002 and 2005 stage musical based on the film

Music
 "Chitty Chitty Bang Bang" (song), a 1968 song from the film
 "Chitty Chitty Bang Bang", a song on the 2010 album H-Logic by Lee Hyori
 "Chitty Chitty Bang Bang", an episode of the American TV series Boston Legal

See also
 Chitty Bang Bang, the informal name of a number of celebrated English racing cars
 Chitty Bang Bang (airship), an airworthy airship constructed for the Chitty Chitty Bang Bang film.
 Chiddy Bang,  an American pop-rap group consisting of Chidera "Chiddy" Anamege & Noah "Xaphoon Jones" Beresin
 "Cheatty Cheatty Bang Bang", a 2005 episode of the television show Veronica Mars
 "Chitty Chitty Death Bang", a 1999 episode of the television show Family Guy
 Bang Bang (disambiguation)